{{Infobox storm
 | event                = 2006 Central Pacific cyclone
 | image                = Storm 91C 01 nov 2006 2030Z.jpg
 | caption              = The cyclone at peak strength on November 1
 | type                 = Tropical cycloneSubtropical cycloneExtratropical cyclone
 | formed               = October 28, 2006
 | dissipated           = November 4, 2006
 | 1-min winds          = 55
 | lowest pressure      = 989
 | location             = British Columbia, Pacific Northwest
 | damages              = Minimal
 | fatalities           = None reported
 | season               = 2006 Pacific hurricane season(unofficially)
}}
The 2006 Central Pacific cyclone, also known as Invest 91C or Storm 91C''', was an unusual weather system that formed in 2006. Forming on October 30 from a mid-latitude cyclone in the north Pacific mid-latitudes, it moved over waters warmer than normal. The system acquired some features more typical of subtropical and even tropical cyclones. However, as it neared the western coastline of North America, the system fell apart, dissipating soon after landfall, on November 4. Moisture from the storm's remnants caused substantial rainfall in British Columbia and the Pacific Northwest. The exact status and nature of this weather event is unknown, with meteorologists and weather agencies having differing opinions.

Meteorological history

By October 31, the system had acquired convection, a warmer-than-normal core, and an eye-like feature. During this time, the storm had moved eastward, then northeastward, before turning northwestward. After that, the storm slowly weakened, looped counter-clockwise, and headed east towards the west coast of North America. This system's center of circulation passed south of observation buoy 46637 on November 1. Other buoys indicated that a rather large area of low pressure was associated with the system. Buoy 46637 was not at the system's center of circulation, so it is possible that this system had a lower minimum pressure than was actually measured. Following its landfall, the storm rapidly weakened and dissipated on the next day.

Impact, preparation, and records
In response to the weather system, the American National Weather Service issued wind watches for the Oregon Coast. The National Weather Service also issues a High Wind Warning for the southern Washington coast all the way south to Tillamook. The system also brought heavy rain to portions of Vancouver Island.

If Storm 91C is considered a tropical or subtropical cyclone, it holds several records. Since it formed at 36°N, this system formed at the northernmost latitude of any cyclone in the eastern north Pacific basin. The previous record-holder was Tropical Storm Wene, which formed at 32°N before crossing the dateline. In addition, this system's track data indicated that it crossed from the central to the east Pacific as it formed at longitude 149°W and dissipated at 135°W. Only two recorded other tropical cyclones had done this previously.  However, since the storm was not officially classified, these records are not justified.

Nature of the system

This system has been considered a tropical, subtropical, or extratropical cyclone.

Mark Guishard, a meteorologist with Bermuda Weather Service, was of the opinion that the system had completed tropical cyclogenesis and was a tropical cyclone. Meteorologist Mark Lander thought that cloud tops were similar to several Atlantic hurricanes, Hurricane Vince in particular. James Franklin, a meteorologist at the National Hurricane Center, said:

The system was of frontal origin... the frontal structure was eventually lost.... The convective structure resembled a tropical, rather than subtropical cyclone, and the radius of maximum winds (based on QuikSCAT) was very close to the center, also more typical of tropical cyclones... on balance, it was more tropical than subtropical.

Clark Evans of Florida State University reported that forecasting tools showed that the system's structure was consistent with that of a subtropical or marginally tropical cyclone. NASA, a non-meteorological government agency, asserted that the system was a subtropical cyclone.

In its review of the 2006 Atlantic hurricane season, the Canadian Hurricane Centre considered this to be an extratropical cyclone.

In 2016, a study by Alica Bently and Nicholas Metz found that this cyclone underwent tropical transition, confirming its status as a tropical cyclone.

Since this system had one-minute sustained winds of 100 km/h (65 mi/h), which are above the 60 km/h (39 mi/h) boundary between a depression and a storm, it would qualify as a named storm if it was a tropical or subtropical cyclone. However, neither of the official Regional Specialized Meteorological Centers for the eastern north Pacific, the National Hurricane Center and the Central Pacific Hurricane Center, include this system in their annual archives, nor is it included in the official "best track" file. Hence, this system is not an official tropical or subtropical cyclone of the 2006 Pacific hurricane season.

See also

 2006 Pacific hurricane season
 2018 Pacific hurricane season
 1951 Hawaii cyclone
 1975 Pacific Northwest hurricane
 1996 Lake Huron cyclone
 Hurricane Catarina
 Tropical Storm Omeka
 Subtropical Cyclone Katie
 Subtropical Cyclone Lexi
 Tropical Storm Rolf
 Cyclone Qendresa
 Cyclone Numa
 Subtropical Storm 96C
 South Atlantic tropical cyclone
 Mediterranean tropical cyclone

References

External links

 Unofficial track data

Central Pacific Cyclone, 2006
Central Pacific Cyclone, 2006
Pacific Northwest storms
Eastern Pacific tropical storms
Subtropical cyclones
2006 Central Pacific cyclone